Protoperigea umbricata is a species of cutworm or dart moth in the family Noctuidae. It is found in North America.

The MONA or Hodges number for Protoperigea umbricata is 9643.1.

References

Further reading

 
 
 

Caradrinini
Articles created by Qbugbot
Moths described in 2006